Dan Dawson (born 1978) is the Iowa State Senator from the 10th District. A Republican, he has served in the Iowa Senate since being elected in 2016. He is an investigation agent of the Iowa Division of Criminal Investigation and served in the United States Army in Iraq and Afghanistan. He was born in Omaha, Nebraska and currently resides in Council Bluffs, Iowa with his wife Chrystal and his two kids.

As of February 2021, Dawson serves on the following committees: Ways & Means (Chair), Judiciary, State Government, and Veterans Affairs. He also serves on the Transportation, Infrastructure, and Capitals Appropriations Subcommittee, as well as the Criminal Justice Information System Advisory Committee, and the Interstate Compact for Adult Offender Supervision State Council.

Electoral history

References

Living people
Republican Party Iowa state senators
People from Omaha, Nebraska
1978 births
Bellevue University alumni
21st-century American politicians